"Vlach" ( or ), also "Wallachian" (and many other variants), is a historical term and exonym used from the Middle Ages until the Modern Era to designate mainly Romanians but also Aromanians, Megleno-Romanians, Istro-Romanians and other Eastern Romance-speaking subgroups of Central and Eastern Europe.

As a contemporary term, in the English language, the Vlachs are the Balkan Romance-speaking peoples who live south of the Danube in what are now southern Albania, Bulgaria, northern Greece, North Macedonia, and eastern Serbia as native ethnic groups, such as the Aromanians, Megleno-Romanians and, in Serbian, the Timok Romanians. The term also became a synonym in the Balkans for the social category of shepherds, and was also used for non-Romance-speaking peoples, in recent times in the western Balkans derogatively. The term is also used to refer to the ethnographic group of Moravian Vlachs who speak a Slavic language but originate from Romanians.

"Vlachs" were initially identified and described during the 11th century by George Kedrenos. According to one origin theory, modern Romanians, Moldovans and Aromanians originated from Dacians. According to some linguists and scholars, the Eastern Romance languages prove the survival of the Thraco-Romans in the lower Danube basin during the Migration Period and western Balkan populations known as "Vlachs" also have had Romanized Illyrian origins.

Nowadays, Eastern Romance-speaking communities are estimated at 26–30 million people worldwide (including the Romanian diaspora and Moldovan diaspora).

Etymology and names 
The word Vlach/Wallachian (and other variants such as Vlah, Valah, Valach, Voloh, Blac, oláh, Vlas, Ilac, Ulah, etc.) is etymologically derived from the ethnonym of a Celtic tribe, adopted into Proto-Germanic *Walhaz, which meant "stranger", from *Wolkā- (Caesar's , Strabo and Ptolemy's ). The root word was notably adopted in Germanic for Wales and Walloon, and in Switzerland for Romansh-speakers, and in Poland Włochy or in Hungary olasz became an exonym for Italians. The Slovenian term Lahi has also been used to designate Italians.

Historically, the term was used primarily for the Romanians. Testimonies from the 13th to 14th centuries show that, although in Europe (and beyond) they were called Vlachs or Wallachians (oláh in Hungarian, Vláchoi (Βλάχοι) in Greek, Volóxi (Воло́хи) in Russian, Walachen in German, Valacchi in Italian, Valaques in French, Valacos in Spanish), the Romanians used for themselves the endonym "Rumân/Român", from the Latin "Romanus" (in memory of Rome). Vlachs are referred in late Byzantine documents as Bulgaro-Albano-Vlachs ("Bulgaralbanitoblahos"), or Serbo-Albano-Bulgaro-VlachsVia both Germanic and Latin, the term started to signify "stranger, foreigner" also in the Balkans, where it in its early form was used for Romance-speakers, but the term eventually took on the meaning of "shepherd, nomad". The Romance-speaking communities themselves, however, used the endonym "Romans". Term Vlach can denote various ethnic elements: "Slovak, Hungarian, Balkan, Transylvanian, Romanian, or even Albanian". According to historian Sima Ćirković, the name "Vlach" in medieval sources has the same rank as the name "Greek", "Serb" or "Latin".During the early history of the Ottoman Empire in the Balkans, there was a military class of Vlachs in Serbia and Ottoman Macedonia, made up of Christians who served as auxiliary forces and had the same rights as Muslims, but their origin is not entirely clear. Some Greeks used "vlachos" as a pejorative term. In Žumberak members of the Greek Catholic Church were called Vlachs, in Carniola residents of Žumberak in general were Vlachs. In Posavina and Bihać area Muslims called Vlachs as Christians (both Orthodox and Catholics) while Catholics under that name consider Orthodox Christians. For residents of the Dalmatian islands population of immigrants (either Croats or Serbs) were called as Vlachs. The name Vlach in Dalmatia also has negative connotations as "newcomer", "peasant", "ignorant" while in Istria the ethnonym Vlach is used to make a distinction between the native Croats and newly settled Istro-Romanian old catholic Vlachs and Slavic population which was coming in the 15th and 16th century.

Romanian scholars have suggested that the term Vlach appeared for the first time in the Eastern Roman Empire and was subsequently spread to the Germanic- and then Slavic-speaking worlds through the Norsemen (possibly by Varangians), who were in trade and military contact with Byzantium during the early Middle Ages (see also Blakumen).

Nowadays, the term Vlachs (also known under other names, such as "Koutsovlachs", "Tsintsars", "Karagouni", "Chobani", "Vlasi", etc.) is used in scholarship for the Romance-speaking communities in the Balkans, especially those in Greece, Albania and North Macedonia. In Serbia the term Vlach (Serbian Vlah, plural Vlasi) is also used to refer to Romanian speakers, especially those living in eastern Serbia. Aromanians themselves use the endonym "Armãn" (plural "Armãni") or "Rãmãn" (plural "Rãmãni"), etymologically from "Romanus", meaning "Roman". Megleno-Romanians designate themselves with the Macedonian form Vla (plural Vlaš) in their own language.

Medieval usage 

The Hellenic chronicle could possibly qualify to the first testimony of Vlachs in Pannonia and Eastern Europe during the time of Attila.

6th century 
What might be the earliest reference to the term “Vlach” comes from the 7th century Byzantine historiographer Theophylact Simocatta, who mentions Blachernae in connection with some historical data of the 6th century, during the reign of Byzantine emperor Maurice.

8th century 
First precise data about Vlachs are in connection with the Vlachs of the Rynchos river; the original document containing the information is from the Konstamonitou monastery.

9th century 
During the late 9th century the Hungarians invaded the Carpathian Basin, where the province of Pannonia was inhabited by the "Slavs [Sclavi], Bulgarians [Bulgarii] and Vlachs [Blachii], and the shepherds of the Romans [pastores Romanorum]" (sclauij, Bulgarij et Blachij, ac pastores romanorum —according to the Gesta Hungarorum, written around 1200 by the anonymous chancellor of King Béla III of Hungary.

10th century 
Chroniclers John Skylitzes and George Kedrenos wrote that in 971, during battles between Romans (Byzantines) and Rus' people led by Sveinald (Sviatoslav I), the people of the north side of Danube came to Emperor John I Tzimiskes and they handed over their fortresses and the Emperor sent troops to guard the fortresses. During those times, Northern part of Danube were dwelled by sedentary Vlachs and tribes of nomad Pechenegs who lived in tents. However, we cannot pass without mentioning that the text makes it crystal clear that it's not talking about the Vlachs, but about the alliance of the Russians, Bulgars, and Pechenegs. Since the text lists the enemy nations who will return the fortresses to the Romans [Byzantines]. Vlachs are not mentioned once in the text.

George Kedrenos mentioned about Vlachs in 976. The Vlachs were guides and guards of Roman (Byzantine) caravans in Balkans. Between Prespa and Kastoria they met and fought with a Bulgarian rebel named David. The Vlachs killed David in their first documented battle.

Mutahhar al-Maqdisi, "They say that in the Turkic neighbourhood there are the Khazars, Russians, Slavs, Waladj, Alans, Greeks and many other peoples".

Ibn al-Nadīm published in 938 the work Kitāb al-Fihrist mentioning "Turks, Bulgars and Vlahs" (using Blagha for Vlachs)

11th century 
Byzantine writer Kekaumenos, author of the Strategikon (1078), described a 1066 revolt against the emperor in Northern Greece led by Nicolitzas Delphinas and other Vlachs.

The names Blakumen or Blökumenn is mentioned in Nordic sagas dating between the 11th–13th centuries, with respect to events that took place in either 1018 or 1019 somewhere at the northwestern part of the Black Sea and believed by some to be related to the Vlachs. Non-Romanian scholars on the subject, such as Omeljan Pritsak, however, point out that the texts probably refer to a nomadic Turkic people, since the "Blakumen" in the texts are “non-christian heathens” and nomadic horsemans.

In the Bulgarian state of the 11th and 12th century, Vlachs live in large numbers, and they were equals to the Bulgarian population.

12th century 

The Russian Primary Chronicle, written ca. 1113, wrote when the Volochi (Vlachs) attacked the Slavs of the Danube and settled among them and oppressed them, the Slavs departed and settled on the Vistula, under the name of Leshi. The Hungarians drove away the Vlachs and took the land and settled there. However, it is important to note that the vast majority of non-Romanian historians do not consider the "Volochi" people mentioned in the text to be Vlachs, but Franks, since the text describes their country in several places, which is the same as the territory of the Frankish Empire, and also mentions the "Volochi" people in places like Normandy, where no Vlachs ever lived.

Traveler Benjamin of Tudela (1130–1173) of the Kingdom of Navarre was one of the first writers to use the word Vlachs for a Romance-speaking population.

Byzantine historian John Kinnamos described Leon Vatatzes' military expedition along the northern Danube, where Vatatzes mentioned the participation of Vlachs in battles with the Magyars (Hungarians) in 1166.

The uprising of brothers Asen and Peter was a revolt of Bulgarians and Vlachs living in the theme of Paristrion of the Byzantine Empire, caused by a tax increase. It began on 26 October 1185, the feast day of St. Demetrius of Thessaloniki, and ended with the creation of the Second Bulgarian Empire, also known in its early history as the Empire of Bulgarians and Vlachs.

13th century 
In 1213, an army of Vlachs, Saxons and Pechenegs, led by the Count of Sibiu, Joachim Türje, attacked the Bulgars and Cumans from Vidin. After this, all Hungarian battles in the Carpathian region were supported by Romance-speaking soldiers from Transylvania.

At the end of the 13th century, during the reign of Ladislaus the Cuman, Simon of Kéza wrote about the Blacki people and placed them in Pannonia with the Huns. Archaeological discoveries indicate that Transylvania was gradually settled by the Magyars, and the last region defended by the Vlachs and Pechenegs (until 1200) was between the Olt River and the Carpathians.

Shortly after the fall of the Land of the Olt, a church was built at the Cârța Monastery and Catholic German-speaking settlers from Rhineland and Mosel Valley (known as Transylvanian Saxons) began to settle in the Orthodox region. In the Diploma Andreanum issued by King Andrew II of Hungary in 1224, "silva blacorum et bissenorum" was given to the settlers. The Orthodox Vlachs spread further northward along the Carpathians to Poland, Slovakia, and Moravia and were granted autonomy under Ius Vlachonicum (Walachian law).

In 1285 Ladislaus the Cuman fought the Tatars and Cumans, arriving with his troops at the Moldova River. A town, Baia (near the said river), was documented in 1300 as settled by the Transylvanian Saxons (see also Foundation of Moldavia). In 1290 Ladislaus the Cuman was assassinated; the new Hungarian king allegedly drove voivode Radu Negru and his people across the Carpathians, where they formed Wallachia along with its first capital Câmpulung (see also Foundation of Wallachia).

14th century 
The biggest caravan shipment between Podvisoki in Bosnia and Republic of Ragusa was recorded on 9 August 1428, where Vlachs transported 1500 modius of salt with 600 horses. In the 14th century royal charters include and some segregation policies declaring that "a Serb shall not marry a Vlach." Although this could be related to the term of the same origin, used for dependent shepherds of that time, like in the Dušan's Code, since the dependent population was encouraged to switch to agriculture, it being of more worth to the crown.

Toponymy 
In addition to the ethnic groups of Aromanians, Megleno-Romanians, and Istro-Romanians who emerged during the Migration Period, other Vlachs could be found as far north as Poland, as far west as Moravia and Dalmatia. In search of better pasture, they were called Vlasi or Valaši by the Slavs.
States mentioned in medieval chronicles were:
 Wallachia – between the Southern Carpathians and the Danube (Ţara Românească in Romanian); Bassarab-Wallachia (Bassarab's Wallachia and Ungro-Wallachia or Wallachia Transalpina in administrative sources; Istro-Vlachia (Danubian Wallachia in Byzantine sources), and Velacia secunda on Spanish maps
 Moldavia – between the Carpathians and the Dniester river (Bogdano-Wallachia; Bogdan's Wallachia, Moldo-Wallachia or Maurovlachia; Black Wallachia, Moldovlachia or Rousso-Vlachia in Byzantine sources); Bogdan Iflak or Wallachia in Polish sources; L'otra Wallachia (the other Wallachia) in Genovese sources and Velacia tertia on Spanish maps
Transylvania – between the Carpathians and the Hungarian plain; Wallachia interior in administrative sources and Velacia prima on Spanish maps
Second Bulgarian Empire, between the Carpathians and the Balkan Mountains – Regnum Bulgarorum et Blachorum in documents by Pope Innocent III
Terra Prodnicorum (or Terra Brodnici), mentioned by Pope Honorius III in 1222. Vlachs led by Ploskanea supported the Tatars in the 1223 Battle of Kalka. Vlach lands near Galicia in the west, Volhynia in the north, Moldova in the south and the Bolohoveni lands in the east were conquered by Galicia.
Bolokhoveni was Vlach land between Kyiv and the Dniester in Ukraine. Place names were Olohovets, Olshani, Voloschi and Vlodava, mentioned in 11th-to-13th-century Slavonic chronicles. It was conquered by Galicia.

Regions and places are:

White Wallachia in Moesia
Great Wallachia (Μεγάλη Βλαχία; Megáli vlahía) in Thessaly
Small Wallachia (Μικρή Βλαχία; Mikrí vlahía) in Aetolia, Acarnania, Dorida and Locrida
Morlachia, in Lika-Dalmatia
Upper Valachia of Moscopole and Metsovon (Άνω Βλαχία; Áno Vlahía) in southern Macedonia, Albania and Epirus
Stari Vlah ("the Old Vlach"), a region in southwestern Serbia
Romanija mountain (Romanija planina) in eastern Bosnia and Herzegovina
Vlașca County, a former county of southern Wallachia (derived from Slavic Vlaška)
Greater Wallachia, an older name for the region of Muntenia, southeastern Romania
Lesser Wallachia, an older name for the region of Oltenia, southwestern Romania
An Italian writer called the Banat Valachia citeriore ("Wallachia on this side") in 1550.
Valahia transalpina, including Făgăraș and Hațeg
Moravian Wallachia, in the Beskid Mountains (Czech: Beskydy) of the Czech Republic.

Shepherd culture 
As national states appeared in the area of the former Ottoman Empire, new state borders were developed that divided the summer and winter habitats of many of the transhumance groups. During the Middle Ages, many Vlachs were shepherds who drove their flocks through the mountains of Central and Eastern Europe. Vlach shepherds may be found as far north as southern Poland (Podhale) and the eastern Czech Republic (Moravia) by following the Carpathians, the Dinaric Alps in the west, the Pindus Mountains in the south, and the Caucasus Mountains in the east.

Some researchers, like Bogumil Hrabak and Marian Wenzel, theorized that the origins of Stećci tombstones, which appeared in medieval Bosnia between 12th and 16th century, could be attributed to Vlach burial culture of Bosnia and Herzegovina of that times.

Legacy 
According to Ilona Czamańska "for several recent centuries the investigation of the Vlachian ethnogenesis was so much dominated by political issues that any progress in this respect was incredibly difficult." The transhumance of Vlachs, the heirs of Roman citizens, may be a key for solving the problem of ethnogenesis, but the problem is that many migrations were in multiple directions during the same time. These migrations were not just part of the Balkans and the Carpathians, they exist and in the Caucasus, the Adriatic islands and possibly over the entire region of the Mediterranean Sea. Because of this, our knowledge concerning primary migrations of the Vlachs and the ethnogenesis is more than modest.

See also 

 Oláh
 Morlachs
 Romania in the Early Middle Ages
 Statuta Valachorum
 Supplex Libellus Valachorum
 Vlach (Ottoman social class)
 Vlach law
 Vlachs in medieval Serbia
 Vlachs in the history of Croatia
 Vlachs in medieval Bosnia and Herzegovina

Notes

References 
 G. Weigand, Die Aromunen, Bd.Α΄-B΄, J. A. Barth (A.Meiner), Leipzig 1895–1894.
 George Murnu, Istoria românilor din Pind, Vlahia Mare 980–1259 ("History of the Romanians of the Pindus, Greater Vlachia, 980–1259"), Bucharest, 1913
 Ilie Gherghel, Câteva consideraţiuni la cuprinsul noţiunii cuvântului "Vlach". Bucuresti: Convorbiri Literare, (1920).
 Theodor Capidan, Aromânii, dialectul aromân. Studiul lingvistic ("Aromanians, Aromanian dialect, Linguistic Study"), Bucharest, 1932
 A.Hâciu, Aromânii, Comerţ. Industrie. Arte. Expasiune. Civiliytie, tip. Cartea Putnei, Focşani 1936.
 Steriu T. Hagigogu, "Romanus şi valachus sau Ce este romanus, roman, român, aromân, valah şi vlah", Bucharest, 1939
 Τ. Winnifrith, The Vlachs. The History of a Balkan People, Duckworth 1987
 A. Koukoudis, Oi mitropoleis kai i diaspora ton Vlachon [Major Cities and Diaspora of the Vlachs], publ. University Studio Press, Thessaloniki 1999.
 A. Keramopoulos, Ti einai oi koutsovlachoi [What are the Koutsovlachs?], publ 2 University Studio Press, Thessaloniki 2000.
 
 Victor A. Friedman, "The Vlah Minority in Macedonia: Language, Identity, Dialectology, and Standardization" in Selected Papers in Slavic, Balkan, and Balkan Studies, ed. Juhani Nuoluoto, et al. Slavica Helsingiensa: 21, Helsinki: University of Helsinki. 2001. 26–50. full text Though focussed on the Vlachs of North Macedonia, has in-depth discussion of many topics, including the origins of the Vlachs, their status as a minority in various countries, their political use in various contexts, and so on.
 Asterios I. Koukoudis, The Vlachs: Metropolis and Diaspora, 2003, 
 
 Th Capidan, Aromânii, Dialectul Aromân, ed2 Εditură Fundaţiei Culturale Aromâne, București 2005
 Nikola Trifon, Les Aroumains, un peuple qui s'en va (Paris, 2005) ; Cincari, narod koji nestaje (Beograd, 2010)

Further reading 
 The Watchmen, a documentary film by Alastair Kenneil and Tod Sedgwick (USA) 1971 describes life in the Vlach village of Samarina in Epiros, Northern Greece
 John Kennedy Campbell, 'Honour Family and Patronage' A Study of Institutions and Moral Values in a Greek Mountain Community, Oxford University Press, 1974
 Gheorghe Bogdan, MEMORY, IDENTITY, TYPOLOGY: AN INTERDISCIPLINARY RECONSTRUCTION OF VLACH ETHNOHISTORY, B.A., University of British Columbia, 1992
 Franck Vogel, a photo-essay on the Valchs published by GEO magazine (France), 2010.
 Adina Berciu-Drăghicescu, Aromâni, meglenoromâni, istroromâni : aspecte identitare şi culturale, Editura Universităţii din București, 2012, 
 Octavian Ciobanu, "The Role of the Vlachs in the Bogomils' Expansion in the Balkans.", Journal of Balkan and Black Sea Studies, Year 4, Issue 7, December 2021, pp. 11–32.

External links 

 ROMÂNII BALCANICI AROMÂNII—Maria Magiru about Aromanians 
 The Vlach Connection and Further Reflections on Roman History
 Orbis Latinus: Wallachians, Walloons, Welschen
 Vlachs in Greece
 Cultural appropriation of Vlachs' heritage
 French Vlachs Association (in Vlach, EN and FR)
 Studies on the Vlachs, by Asterios Koukoudis
 Vlachs' in Greece (in Greek)
 Consiliul A Tinirlor Armanj, Youth Aromanian community and their Projects (in Vlach, EN and RO)
 Old Wallachia—a short Czech film from 1955 depicting life of Vlachs in Czech Moravia

Eastern Romance people
Transhumant ethnic groups